Ali Khan Ashar was the second khan of the Zanjan Khanate from 1780 to 1782.

References

 Anvar Changhiz Oglu, Aydın Avşar, Avşarlar, Bakı, "Şuşa", 2008,

People from Zanjan, Iran
Zanjan Khanate
Ethnic Afshar people